Bhusawal railway division is one of the five railway divisions of the Central Railway (India) zone of Indian Railways, located at Bhusawal in the Jalgaon district of Maharashtra state in western India. The other railway divisions are: Mumbai CSMT, Nagpur, Solapur and Pune. There are 115 railway stations in  the Bhusawal railway division.

History
Milestones 
In 1853, the Survey for extension of Mumbai-Thane line beyond Igatpuri towards Khandesh was completed. By 1860, the Bhusawal Station building with a single platform was constructed. The following year, the Igatpuri – Bhusawal section was opened on October 1st. By 1866, the  Bhusawal – Khandwa Section was opened and in 1867, the Bhusawal – Badnera section became active as single line.
  
In 1920, the Bhusawal division was formed under the Great Indian Peninsula Railway (GIPR) and within the next two years, the doubling of the Bhusawal - Badnera section was completed.

Eventually, Bhusawal become part of the Central Railway Zone in 1951 and in 1962, the Central Railway Zonal Training School setup at Bhusawal. Electrification with 25 KV AC Traction was completed for the Igatpuri – Bhusawal section in 1969 and by 1972, Bhusawal Electric Loco shed started functioning. The Bhusawal-Badnera Section was electrified with 25 kV AC traction in 1990 and the Bhusawal Khandwa Section was electrified in 1992. As a result, by 1993, the Bhusawal steam loco shed was shut down and the last steam loco was withdrawn from service on 16 December 1993.

Connections
It connects other railway division of central railway zone at
 Mumbai CSMT division at Igatpuri,
 Solapur Railway Division at Manmad Jn,
 Nagpur Railway Division at Badnera Junction.

It connects to other Zones of Indian railways at

 Mamnad Jn to Nanded Railway Division of South Central Railway zone
 Jalgaon Jn to Mumbai(WR) railway division of Western Railway zone
 Khandwa Jn. to Bhopal Junction railway division of Western Central Railway Zone
 Khandwa Jn to Ratlam Division of Western Railway zone
 Khandwa Jn to Nanded Railway Division of South Central Railway zone
 Akola Jn to Nanded Railway Division of South Central Railway zone

List of railway stations and towns 
The list includes the stations  under the Bhusawal division and their station category.

Junction stations
The Junction railway stations in the Bhusawal railway divisions are: Chalisgaon Jn, Pachora Jn, Jalgaon Jn, Bhusawal Jn, Manmad jn, Khandwa Jn, Jalamb Jn, Akola Jn, Murtajapur Jn, Badnera Jn.

Railway line and en route stations 
There are three main lines in this railway subdivision and numerous branch lines.

The railway line en route station details are as follows:

Igatpuri-Bhusawal line
Igatpuri(Exclude)-Manmad Jn-Chalisgaon Jn-Pachora Jn-Jalgaon Jn-Bhusawal Jn
En route station details- Igatpuri - Ghoti - Padli - Asvali - Lahavit - Devlali - Nasik Road - Odha - Kherwadi - Kasbe Sukene - Niphad - Ugaon - Lasalgaon - Summit - Manmad Jn - Panewadi - Hisvahal - Panjhan - Nandgaon - Pimparkhed - Naydongari - Rohini - Hirapur - Chalisgaon Jn - Vaghali - Kajgaon - Nagardevla - Galan - Pachora Jn - Pardhade - Maheji - Mhasawad - Shirsoli - Jalgaon Jn - Bhadli - Bhusawal Jn
Chalisgaon Jn- Dhule
En route station details- Chalisgaon Jn - Bhoras Budruk - Jamdha - Rajmane - Mordad Tanda - Shirud - Borvihar - Mohade P Laling - Dhule
Pachora Jn- Jamner (Narrow Gauge)
En route station details- Pachora Jn - Varkhedi - Pimpalgaon - Shendurni - Pahur - Bhagdara - Jamner

Bhusawal-Khandwa line
Bhusawal Jn-Burhanpur-Khandwa Jn(Include)
En route station details- Bhusawal Jn - Duskheda - Savda - Nimbhora - Raver - Wghoda. - Burhanpur - Asirgarh Road - Chandni - Nepa Nagar - Mandwa - Sagphata - Dongargaon - Kohdad - Bagmar - Badegaon Gujar - Khandwa Jn

Bhusawal-Badnera line
Bhusawal Jn-Jalamb Jn-Akola Jn-Murtajapur Jn- (Include)
En route station details- Bhusawal Jn - Varangaon - Achegaon - Bodwad - Kolhadi. - Khamkhed - Malkapur - Wadoda - Biswa Bridge - Kumgaon Burti - Nandura - Jalamb Jn - Shegaon - Shrikshetra Nagzari - Paras - Gaigaon - Akola  Jn  - Yavatmal- Ladkhed - Borgaon - Katepurna - Murtajapur Jn - Mana - Mandura. - Kurum - Takli - Badnera Jn
Jalamb Jn-Khamgaon
En route station details- Jalamb Jn - Khamgaon
-Yavatmal (Narrow Gauge) See also Shakuntala Railway
En route station details- Murtizapur Junction - Murtajapur Town - Kinkhed - Vilegaon. - Bhadsivni - Pohe - Karanja - Karanja Town - Somthan - Sangwi. - Warudkhed -  - Tapona - Ladkhed - Linga - Lasina - Yavatmal
Murtizapur Junction-Achalpur (Narrow Gauge) See also Shakuntala Railway
En route station details- Murtajapur Jn - Lakhpuri - Banosa - Lehgaon - Kokalda - Kapustalni - Anjangaon - Pathrot - Khusta Buzurg - Chamak - Nowbagh - Achalpur
Badnera Jn-Amravati
En route station details- Badnera Jn -  Amravati

Information

 Bhuswal railway division serves the following districts of Maharashtra viz Nasik, Malegaon, Dhule, Jalgaon, Buldhana, Akola, Amravati, Washim, Yavatmal of Maharashtra and Burhanpur, Khandwa districts of Madhya Pradesh.
 Bhusawal railway division is divided into three main sections viz. Bhusawal - Igatpuri on Mumbai route, Bhusawal - Khandwa on Itarsi route, and Bhusawal - Badnera section on Nagpur route.

References 

 
Divisions of Indian Railways
1920 establishments in India

Transport in Bhusawal